The following is a list of Sites of Special Scientific Interest in the North West Sutherland  Area of Search; for South East Sutherland see List of SSSIs in South East Sutherland. For SSSIs elsewhere in Scotland, see List of SSSIs by Area of Search.

 Aird Torrisdale
 Altnaharra
 A' Mhoine
 Ardvar Woodlands
 Armadale Gorge
 Assynt Lochs
 Bad na Gallaig
 Ben Griams
 Ben Hope
 Ben Hutig
 Ben Klibreck
 Ben Loyal
 Ben More Assynt
 Cam Loch
 Cape Wrath
 Carn A'Mhadaidh
 Cnoc an Alaskie
 Druim na Coibe
 Druim nam Bad
 Durness
 East Halladale
 Eilean Hoan
 Eilean nan Ròn
 Eriboll
 Foinaven
 Forsinard Bogs
 Handa Island
 Inverhope
 Invernaver
 Inverpolly
 Knockan Cliff
 Knockfin Heights
 Laxford Moors
 Loch a' Mhuilinn
 Loch Awe and Loch Ailsh
 Loch Beannach Islands
 Loch Glencoul
 Loch Laxford
 Loch Meadie Peatlands
 Loch Stack
 Loch Urigill
 Lochan Buidhe Mires
 Lon a' Chuil
 Mallart
 Red Point Coast
 River Borgie
 Rumsdale Peatlands
 Scourie Coast
 Sheigra - Oldshore More
 Skelpick Peatlands
 Skinsdale Peatlands
 Sletill Peatlands
 Southern Parphe
 Stack Woods
 Strathy Bogs
 Strathy Coast
 Syre Peatlands
 Truderscaig
 West Borgie
 West Halladale
 West Strathnaver

 
North West Sutherland